The D1 is a east-west motorway in Slovakia. Its route is Bratislava (D2/D4) - Trnava (R1) - Trenčín (R2) - Púchov (R6) - Žilina (D3) - Martin (R3) Ruzomberok (R3) - Poprad - Prešov (R4) - Košice (R4) - Michalovce - SK/UA border. It is the main motorway in Slovakia as well as being the longest and busiest motorway in Slovakia.

It forms part of the following European routes: E50, E58, E75, E571 and of the V.A Pan-European corridor (Trieste) - Bratislava - Žilina - Košice - Uzhorod - (Lviv)

With the exception of sections in Bratislava a vignette is required to use the motorway.

Chronology

The first plans to connect Prague to Slovakia and Mukachevo in today's Zakarpattia Oblast in Ukraine, which was part of Czechoslovakia at that time, were in the 1930s. The construction of the motorway (freeway) began in the Czech part in the late 1930s, but in the Slovak part nothing was built. After the end of World War II, highway construction was abandoned, due to  post-war reconstruction. But in the 1960s, traffic was growing very fast, and a new plan for a D1 highway was available soon, without the part in Zakarpattia Oblast, which became part of the USSR in 1945.

In the Czech part of Czechoslovakia construction work began in 1967. In the Slovak part it began in 1973 by the construction of the part Ivachnová - Liptovský Mikuláš, a 14 km long section in northern Slovakia, along with the construction of the Liptovská Mara dam. In 1972 construction of section from Bratislava to Senec began (it was D61 at that time) and in the 1970s extended to Trnava (total 36 km). The 19 km Prešov - Košice motorway was added in 1980. Until the Dissolution of Czechoslovakia in 1993, another 20 km were built - from L. Mikuláš to Hybe -, totalling some 52 km in the Slovak part, contrasting to 224 km in Czech part. D61 was built to the village of Horná Streda few kilometres behind Piešťany in 1988, with the total length of that section 42 km. Further 45 km were built after 1993 on D1, and another 27 km on D61, until D1 and D61 merged with each other to form the current D1 motorway.

In 1999, Dzurinda's government stopped or slowed down construction on unopened sections - around Sverepec, for example and stopped preparation for various others. Construction continued again since 2002. Construction works continue today, and the planned date for finishing the entire motorway from Bratislava to Košice varies. 
The most difficult section to construct will be between Žilina and Ružomberok, as there will be  most of the tunnels on the entire motorway, including the longest one near Višňové. The motorway has also disputed planned section around Prešov, as there are disagreements over the planned routes.

There are plans to "finish" D1 between Bratislava and Košice in 2015 - with several important exceptions. Žilina and Prešov bypasses will be temporarily substituted by four-lane road through these towns and all tunnels between Žilina and Prešov will be opened only as two-lane tunnels with two-way traffic. Four-lane motorway connecting two largest towns in Slovakia will be finished at the earliest in 2018.
.

Section at Prešov was opened in late 2021. That also includes a Prešov tunnel with 2240 meters of length.

D1 will be completed around year 2027, as 3+3 lane motorway from Bratislava to Trnava, 2+2 lane motorway from Trnava to Michalovce and 1+1 lane highway from Michalovce to Slovakia/Ukraine border.

Sections of the motorway

Bridges and viaducts
This is a list of bridges and viaducts as seen when moving from west to east:

Tunnels
This is a list of tunnels as seen when moving from west to east:

Gallery

See also

 Highway D1 (Czech Republic)
 Motorway D61

External links
 Exit list of Highway D1 
 National Motorway Company 

Highways in Slovakia
Proposed roads
Proposed transport infrastructure in Slovakia